Des Plaines Fish and Wildlife Area is an Illinois state park on  in Will County, Illinois, United States.  It is located on floodplain adjacent to the confluence of the Des Plaines River (after which this park was named) and the Kankakee River to form the Illinois River.

History

Prior to 1948 what is now called the Des Plaines Fish and Wildlife Area was owned by the federal government. The Illinois Department of Conservation acquired the site in 1948 and established its use as a recreation area. Additional land was accessed following the completion of Interstate 55 in the 1960s. From that time to 1975, the area was used primarily by hunters and unmanaged day use. The Division of Land Management took over the area in 1976 and since then, extensive upgrading of facilities has occurred. In recent years, more than 350,000 people annually visit Des Plaines—an area of over 5,000 acres, with approximately 200 acres of water.

Picnicking

A restful break from hunting, fishing or hiking can be a special event. Picnickers can choose to lunch along the Kankakee River or under the large shelter on the banks of Milliken Lake. Both sites provide tables, stoves and water along with cooling shade trees and picturesque views. A playground area is also provided at the Milliken Lake site.

Fishing

Open water and ice fishing are popular events as well, and productive! Milliken Lake, as well as several ponds and the river backwaters, provide panfish, catfish, and bass fishing. Milliken Lake is stocked with catchable trout in the spring. The Kankakee River borders the site on the south with 3 miles of shoreline providing access to boating enthusiasts and excellent walleye and northern pike fishing.

Camping

Camping area closed indefinitely effective 3/2010 due to lack of funding.

Designated camping areas were available for those wishing to stay overnight at the site. These were Class C (vehicular access, no showers) areas with graveled pads, water and pit toilets. The campground was open from 6 a.m. to 10 p.m. daily, from mid-April (weather permitting) to mid-October, closed the rest of the year.

Boating

A public boat launch with 3 paved ramps is available on the Kankakee River for boating on the river or its backwaters. Motors are limited to 10 horsepower or less on the backwaters, but there are no limits on the Kankakee River. No boating is allowed on Milliken Lake.

Equestrian trail

A twelve mile trail is open from mid April through October weather permitting. The trail hours are 6 a.m. to 10 p.m.

Hunting

Pheasant hunting is the most popular choice for sportsmen at Des Plaines, and the largest pheasant hunting (by permit only) facility in the state is located at the site. For variety, however, there are unlimited numbers of deer, rabbit, dove, and coyote. All hunters are required to have permits and check in at the site office. Waterfowl hunting is available at the nearby Will County Waterfowl Management Area, with hunting blinds being allocated via drawings.

Nature preserve

Eighty acres of the Des Plaines Wildlife and Conservation Area make up a dedicated nature preserve which contains many remnants of the natural prairie of years past. The preserve is managed so it can protect and perpetuate this prairie heritage for future generations. Visitors are encouraged to view this area, but are reminded that all plants and animals here are protected and are not to be disturbed in any way.

Hand trap range

Two hand trap ranges and an archery range are open to the public daily except during pheasant hunting season. Sportsmen are welcome to practice and hone their skills so they will be ready to go on opening day.

Shooting sports

In addition to the two hand trap ranges and the archery range. Des Plaines hosts three wingshooting clinics and two Hunter Safety Classes annually. The wingshooting clinics are held on the first weekend following Mothers Day (Youth and Ladies Clinics), on the first weekend in June and the third weekend in September (both are for experienced shooters); the Hunters Safety Classes are available in June and August.

Dog training

The Des Plaines Fish and Wildlife Area is well known for numerous field trials and dog training events held throughout the year. The plentiful open areas, swampy backwater areas, and woodlands provide a perfect spot for all types of training. Whether you are training your animal or just being a spectator, these events can be a great way to spend a day or weekend outdoors.

Disabled access

The following programs have disabled accessibility: Hunting, Fishing, Camping, and Picnicking.

References
 https://web.archive.org/web/20160923135401/http://dnr.state.il.us/lands/landmgt/PARKS/I%26M/EAST/DESPLAIN/Park.htm

State parks of Illinois
Protected areas of Will County, Illinois
Illinois River
Protected areas established in 1948
1948 establishments in Illinois